Cobetia is a genus of bacteria. Members belonging to this genus are Gram-negative, aerobic and halotolerant bacteria . Cobetia amphilecti

References

External links
 Cobetia LPSN

Oceanospirillales
Bacteria genera